The 1991 Donnay Indoor Championships was a men's tennis tournament played on indoor carpet courts at the Forest National in Brussels, Belgium which was part of the 1990 ATP Tour. It was the 10th edition of the tournament and was held from 11 February until 17 February 1991. Fourth-seeded Guy Forget won the singles title.

Finals

Singles

 Guy Forget defeated  Andrei Cherkasov, 6–3, 7–5, 3–6, 7–6

Doubles

 Todd Woodbridge /  Mark Woodforde defeated  Libor Pimek /  Michiel Schapers, 6–3, 6–0

References

Donnay Indoor Championships
Donnay
+